Derk "Dick" Schneider (born 21 March 1948 in Deventer) is a retired Dutch footballer who was active as a defender. Schneider made his professional debut at Go Ahead and also played for Feyenoord, FC Zutphen and FC Wageningen.

Honours
 1970-71 : Eredivisie winner with Feijenoord
 1973-74 : Eredivisie winner with Feyenoord
 1973-74 : UEFA Cup winner with Feyenoord

References

 Profile

1948 births
Living people
Dutch footballers
Feyenoord players
Go Ahead Eagles players
UEFA Cup winning players
Eredivisie players
Netherlands international footballers
Footballers from Deventer
FC Wageningen players
Association football defenders